Cléber Luis Alberti  or simply  Cléber  (born August 20, 1982) is a goalkeeper player from Brazil, who plays for Portuguese Liga de Honra side GD Estoril.

Made professional debut for Atlético-PR in 0-0 draw at home to Goiás in the Campeonato Brasileiro on October 5, 2002.

Honours
 Campeonato Paranaense in 2001 and 2002 with Atlético Paranaense
 Campeonato Pernambucano in 2005 with Santa Cruz Futebol Clube
 Campeonato Pernambucano in 2007 and 2008 with Sport Club do Recife
 Copa do Brasil in 2008 with Sport Club do Recife

Contract
27 April 2007 to 30 April 2010

References

External links
 meuSport.com
 sportnet.com.br
 rubronegro.net
 sambafoot.com
 Sport Club do Recife Official Site
 CBF

1982 births
Living people
Brazilian footballers
Brazilian expatriate footballers
Expatriate footballers in Portugal
Club Athletico Paranaense players
Santa Cruz Futebol Clube players
Sport Club do Recife players
Association football goalkeepers